Michaël Raitner is a French singer. He is best known for "On doit savoir partir" and "La grange au loup", both 1977.

Discography
 1975 : "Viens, il va falloir aller plus loin..." / Que s'est-il passé avant nous (under the name Michaël Raytner)
 1976 : "On doit savoir partir" / C'était la grange aux loups
 1977 : "Je n'ai plus rien" / On verra
 1977 : "On se souvient pour oublier" / La nostalgie nous va bien  
 1980 : "Vivre libre sans amour" / Le droit de t'aimer
 1985 : "Sa voix qui me rappelle" / Quand on dit je t'aime à une fille
 1986 : "Ultra sensible" / Esclave
 1996 : "Femmes orientales"

References

1953 births
Living people
French male singers